Cebu Taoist Temple is a Taoist temple located in Beverly Hills Subdivision of Cebu City, Philippines.

History 
The temple was built by Cebu's substantial Filipino-Chinese community in 1972.

Unlike the neighboring Phu Sian Temple, the Taoist temple is open to worshipers and non-worshipers alike. A ritual among devotees is where one prays to the gods to grant one's wish. The ritual includes washing hands, going inside the chapel barefoot and dropping two blocks of wood. If the wood blocks are both face up then one could make a wish. If not then it is not yet the time for one's wish to be granted and one has to come to the temple some other time.

The temple is the center of worship for Taoism, the religion which follows the teachings of the ancient Chinese philosopher, Lao Zi. Another ritual among Taoist devotees, which is done during Wednesdays and Sundays, is the climbing of its 81 steps (representing the 81 chapters of Taoism scriptures) to light joss sticks and have their fortune read by the monks.

Some guide books and travel agencies offer trips to the temple or as a side-trip in a tour around Cebu City. But it is more popular with grade school students.

The entrance to the temple was a replica of the Great Wall of China. The temple includes a chapel, a library, a souvenir shop, and a wishing well. The spacious balconies offer a scenic view of the downtown Cebu.

Gallery

References

External links
 

Buildings and structures in Cebu City
Chinese-Filipino culture
Temples in the Philippines
Taoist temples
Tourist attractions in Cebu City
Taoism in the Philippines
Overseas Chinese organisations
20th-century Taoist temples
20th-century religious buildings and structures in the Philippines